Sandhya Bhraman (Evening Walk) is a short story collection by Bhabendra Nath Saikia. It was the last collection of Saikia's short story collection in his lifetime. It was first published in 1998. The stories those were included in the book are:
 "Sandhya Bhraman"
 "Tarulata"
 "Prabhat"
 "Mukhamukhi"
 "Khadyapran"
 "Pakhanda"
 "Aishwarya"
 "Rajbhog"
 "Grahak"
 "Debodut"
 "Upapatni"
 "Bilash"
 "Aranya"
 "Smarak"
 "Pathsala"
 "Sahayika"
 "Ranabhanga"

Assamese short story collections
1998 short story collections